Yanagawa is a 2021 Chinese drama film written and directed by Korean-Chinese filmmaker Zhang Lü and stars Ni Ni , Zhang Luyi and Xin Baiqing. It was screened as opening film of Pingyao International Film Festival and invited for "ICONS" section at the 26th Busan International Film Festival on October 12, 2021. The film won the highest award Golden Cyclo at the 28th Vesoul International Film Festival of Asian Cinema. It had been a theatrical release in China on August 12, 2022.

Plot
Li Dong (Zhang Luyi) in his youth had once admired a woman named A Chuan (Ni Ni), but one day A Chuan's sudden disappearance became a knot in his heart that he could not solve for more than ten years. In order to resolve their thoughts, Li Dong and his brother Li Chun (Xin Baiqing) went to Liu Chuan, who has the same name as A Chuan, just to see her again. As they met again, the truth of many past stories surfaced, and Li Dong also knew the real reason for A Chuan's departure back then, but his deep love for A Chuan was in this affectionate confession of going to "her" hometown intensifying...

Cast
Ni Ni as A Chuan
Zhang Luyi as Li Dong
Xin Baiqing as Li Chun
Sosuke Ikematsu 
 Ryoko Nakano as an old woman in Yanagawa
Ninon
Wang Jiajia as Li Chun's wife
Nai An

Awards and nominations

References

External links

2021 films
2020s Mandarin-language films
Chinese drama films
2021 drama films
Films directed by Zhang Lu
Films set in Fukushima Prefecture